Archescytinidae is an extinct family of fungus-feeding thrips belonging to the order Thysanoptera that was first defined by Robert John Tillyard in 1926. They are the oldest known thrips family and they existed between the Asselian epoch of the Early Permian and the Toarcian epoch of the Early Jurassic.

References

Thrips
Prehistoric insect families